Atul Satya Koushik is a theatre artist who is active in Indian theatre as a playwright, director, producer and promoter. For more than a decade now He has been making large stage productions featuring popular celebrities from Bollywood, TV and Theatre. His plays generally feature large sets, period costumes and big on stage cast. He is a supporter and promoter of commercial theatre in India and has done various ticketed shows running to full houses. After he was denied admission in premier drama and film institutes of the country, he formed his own theatre company in Delhi in 2009 and then entered into collaborations with various producers over years to make inspiring stage productions. He is also known for making an unconventional career choice after getting coveted education in the field of finance and law.

Education and early career 

He got senior secondary education in the field of Commerce from Mother's Global School, Preet Vihar before joining the prestigious Shri Ram College of Commerce in University of Delhi to finish his graduation in commerce with honours. Soon after, he finished his studies of Chartered Accountancy and became a member of Institute of Chartered Accountants of India. He also holds a degree in law from the Faculty of Law, University of Delhi.

Still in his early thirties, he has written more than 20 full-length plays so far including Chakrayuh which marks the comeback of Nitish Bharadwaj as Krishna, Legend of Ram which brings back Arun Govil as Ram after three decades, Ballygunge 1990 featuring Anup Soni, Raavan Ki Ramayan starring Puneet Issar as Raavan, Pajama Party featuring Kamya Panjabi and Kavita Kaushik, Draupadi featuring Himani Shivpuri and Rakesh Bedi, Wo Lahore featuring Avtar Gill, Kahani Teri Meri with Kiran Kumar, Saudagar – An Indian adaptation of Shakespeare’s Merchant of Venice, Couple Trouble starring Kashmera Shah, Dad's Girlfriend, Bade Shahar Ke Log, Kaali Shalwar Aur Khushiya based on stories by Saadat Hasan Manto, George Orwell's popular work Animal Farm, Temporary Matter and others in the past few years. He has staged more than 1000 shows of these plays which are absolutely different from each other in terms of content as well as treatment.

Atul belongs to the new age of playwrights who are trying to fill the vacuum of good original Hindi plays which is being felt by theatre practitioners in India for quite some time. Having an experience of over 12 years in theatre at various levels, his relation with the art form dates back to 2001. His plays Chakravyuh, Raavan Ki Ramayan, Draupadi, Dad's Girlfriend and Wo Lahore are some of his promising contributions to original play-writing in India. He has also come up with some remarkable adaptations of classic Indian and foreign literature in the form of Kahani Teri Meri, Kaali Shalwar and Animal Farm.

His plays based on chapters from mythology with streaks of his imagination such as Draupadi and Chakravyuh have won accolades for its performances in various parts of India. Atul was invited by Lok Sabha Speaker Sumitra Mahajan to perform his play Chakravyuh at Rajya Sabha Auditorium for a show for the Members of Indian Parliament.

Atul's play Draupadi starring and shows how the lives of 21st century women resonate chapters from the Panchal princess' life. Using the dramatic device of a play within a play, the director has chosen 11 female actors to enact this juxtaposition. It shows how a set of Haryanvi females take the liberty of the absence of males in their house to perform the banned play Draupadi, but end up finding a reflection of Draupadi's life in theirs. Veteran film and TV actor Rakesh Bedi has also been seen in this women-oriented production.

Atul's another popular play Wo Lahore shows the internal conflicts in an ordinary Indian family against the backdrop of the freedom struggle and social beliefs of the Partition. TV actor Avtar Gill was recently seen in a cameo in the play Wo Lahore that has been staged in over 10 cities including Lucknow, Chandigarh, Delhi and Mumbai.

Atul has recently been awarded with the Saluting The Entrepreneurs Award by Times Group for his excellence in the field of art and theatre. His organisational skill is seen in the formation of The Films and Theatre Society in 2009 encouraging young people working in different fields into its fold. The group is known for organising an impressive festival of literature, films and theatre annually in Delhi. In a short span, Atul has been able to build an audience for his shows that are invariably staged to a capacity hall.

Plays

Awards and achievements 

Best Theatre Director Award in Indian Global Star Awards.

RAI Vasundhara Ratna Award for his contribution in the field of theatre and art to be given in November 2017 by Respect Age International.

Times Entrepreneurship Award in the field of theatre by Times Group in 2016.

Best Performing Arts Promoter Award for his contribution in Indian Theatre by Abhinaya Rangmanch, Hissar in 2016.

Pioneer in Commercial Theatre Award by Artists' India in 2015.

Yuva Natya Nirdesak Puruskar by Sahitya Kala Parishad, Govt. of NCT of Delhi in 2013.

His play Ballygunge 1990 was officially selected and staged at the prestigious Bharat Rang Mahotsav organised by National School of Drama in February, 2020.

His plays have been performed at various prestigious festivals and platforms such as Jaipur Rang Mahotsav, Kala Ghoda Arts Festival, Bhartendu Natya Uysav, Yuva Satya Utsav, Parliament House Auditorium, residence of veteran Indian politician Lal Krishna Advani.

Only active playwright-theatre director in India with a CA and Law degree

Books and published works 

His play Chakravyuh has been published by Times Group Books in the form of a book in the year 2016. Foreword of this book has been written by Lal Krishna Advani. His other plays including "Raavan Ki Ramayan" and "Draupadi" are also under publication and will soon be available.

References

http://aajtak.intoday.in/story/draupadi-play-directed-by-atul-satya-kaushik-1-808830.html

http://timesofindia.indiatimes.com/entertainment/hindi/theatre/A-play-on-Draupadis-of-the-21st-century/articleshow/49384764.cms

External links
Facebook
Instagram
YouTube
LinkedIn

Delhi University alumni
Living people
Indian theatre directors
Indian male dramatists and playwrights
Dramatists and playwrights from Delhi
1985 births